Ukonvesi is a medium-sized lake in the Vuoksi main catchment area. It is located in the Southern Savonia region in Finland.

See also
List of lakes in Finland

References

Lakes of Mikkeli